Randia carlosiana is a species of plant in the family Rubiaceae. It is endemic to Ecuador.

Sources 

Flora of Ecuador
carlosiana
Endangered plants
Taxonomy articles created by Polbot